Yi Yang-suk (리양숙) was a North Korean politician (Communist).

She served as Minister of Commerce in 1962–1963 and Minister of Commerce and Minister of Textile and Paper Industries in 1967–1972.

References

20th-century North Korean women politicians
20th-century North Korean politicians
Year of birth missing (living people)
Place of birth missing (living people)
Women government ministers of North Korea